The  New York Giants season was the franchise's 10th season in the National Football League. The Giants denied the Bears a perfect season as the Giants went on to win what would become known as the "Sneakers Game".

Preseason

Schedule

Game Summaries

Week 3: at Detroit Lions

Week 4: at Green Bay Packers

Week 5, Game 1: at Pittsburgh Pirates

Week 5, Game 2: at Boston Redskins

Week 6: vs. Brooklyn Dodgers

Week 7: vs. Pittsburgh Pirates

Week 8: vs. Philadelphia Eagles

Week 9: at Chicago Bears

Week 10: vs. Green Bay Packers

Week 11: vs. Chicago Bears

Week 12: vs. Boston Redskins

Week 13, Game 1: at Brooklyn Dodgers

Week 13, Game 2: at Philadelphia Eagles

NFL Championship Game

Standings

See also
List of New York Giants seasons

References

New York Giants seasons
New York Giants
National Football League championship seasons
New York Giants
1930s in Manhattan
Washington Heights, Manhattan